These are the official results of the Men's Team Time Trial at the 1972 Summer Olympics in Munich, West Germany, held on 29 August 1972. There were 140 participants from 35 nations. No bronze medal was awarded, as the Netherlands were disqualified when Aad van den Hoek tested positive for coramine. The fourth-placed Belgian team were not awarded the bronze medal because they had not been tested for drugs.

Final classification

References

Road cycling at the 1972 Summer Olympics
Cycling at the Summer Olympics – Men's team time trial